The John Butler Trio are an Australian roots/rock band led by guitarist and vocalist John Butler, an APRA and ARIA-award-winning musician. They formed in Fremantle in 1998 with Jason McGann on drums, Gavin Shoesmith on bass and John Butler on vocals. By 2009, the trio consisted of Butler with Byron Luiters on bass and Nicky Bomba on drums and percussion, the latter being replaced by Grant Gerathy in 2013. After both Luiters and Gerathy exited the trio in early 2019, bassist OJ Newcomb and drummer Terepai Richmond (also of The Whitlams) joined the band, accompanied by touring musician Elana Stone on keyboards, percussion and backing vocals.

The band's second studio album, Three (2001) reached the top 30 in the Australian album charts and achieved platinum sales. The band's subsequent studio albums: Sunrise Over Sea (2004); Grand National (2007); and April Uprising (2010) all debuted at the number one position on the Australian album charts, with all three albums reaching platinum sales status. Living 2001–2002 (2003), the band's first live album, reached the top ten and also achieved platinum status in Australia. The band's second live album, Live at St. Gallen (2005), also achieved gold record status. The band's releases since 2002 have been marketed independently by Jarrah Records, which Butler co-owns with West Australian folk band the Waifs and manager of both acts, Philip Stevens. Their most recent studio album, Home, was released in 2018.

History

Early career
The John Butler Trio is fronted by John Butler on vocals and guitars.  He started his career as a busker in Fremantle, Western Australia and released a self-recorded cassette, Searching for Heritage in 1996. Gavin Shoesmith on double bass and bass guitar founded Katamaran in Darwin with Mark Hoffman on didgeridoo and Grant Smith on percussion. With Butler, Shoesmith and Jason McGann on drums, John Butler Trio was formed in Fremantle in 1998 and independently released the John Butler album in December. It was produced by Butler and included re-recorded versions of two tracks from his Searching for Heritage.

The trio toured throughout Western Australia in 1999, then The Waifs invited Butler to perform solo on their Australian tour – he also performed his own gigs. The John Butler Trio then launched their own tour where Butler met his future wife Danielle Caruana in Broome.

The John Butler Trio released the four-track extended play, JBT, in April 2000 with songs short enough to win radio play. It was produced by Butler and Shaun O'Callaghan. Radio station Triple J chose the track "Pickapart" to put on high rotation. The band began to develop a wider reputation with a performance at the East Coast Blues & Roots Music Festival in Byron Bay in 2000. Butler recalled that his first gig had about 50 people, the second gig started the same way when "it absolutely pissed with rain and 3000 people ran into our tent. And the show just went berserk. It was like a suffocated fire – you lift the lid and it explodes". The John Butler Trio has become a regular artist at the annual event.

Three
In April 2001, John Butler Trio released Three and relocated to Melbourne to promote the record on the east coast. The track, "Betterman", was on high rotation by Triple J. Three  peaked at No. 24 on the ARIA Charts. It also remained on the alternative charts for nine months reaching No. 3. At the ARIA Music Awards of 2001 the album won an award for 'Best Independent Release'. "Betterman" reached No. 5 on the Triple J Hottest 100, 2001.

Shoesmith left the trio to form his own band, The Groovesmiths, Butler replaced him with 19-year-old Rory Quirk, who was on their first tour of the United States in 2001. Quirk, in turn, left in 2002 to pursue a career with his band, Quirk. Andrew Fry joined as the next bass player.

The success of Three led to its release in the US in 2002 and two tours of the US followed. The band supported the Dave Matthews Band and John Mayer as well as playing at the Bonnaroo Music Festival and the South by Southwest Festival. The band also played at the Splendour in the Grass Festival in Australia. Butler, his manager Phil Stevens and fellow Western Australian folk artists, The Waifs, founded Jarrah Records in July 2002.

As a result of intensive touring, the band developed a great live reputation in Australia. The band released Living 2001-2002 in February 2003, a double live album which had a top ten debut in the ARIA album charts and went on to achieve platinum sales. Butler took a brief break after five years of solid work since 1997 for the birth of his daughter Banjo.

Sunrise Over Sea 
In late 2003, John Butler entered Woodstock Studios in Melbourne owned by Joe Camilleri, the leader of Jo Jo Zep and the Black Sorrows. He had a new band consisting of percussionist Nicky Bomba and upright-bass player Shannon Birchall. After recording the album, Bomba returned to his own reggae band and was replaced by drummer/percussionist Michael Barker.

John Butler told the Australian edition of Rolling Stone released in April 2004 that he wanted greater freedom to pursue his vision. "Essentially what I learnt out of this process was, more so than ever, I'm the keeper of the music. I have the intuition and the foresight to pick the right players to my music. I've learned it's not always about having the same players for five, six or 10 years, it’s having the right chemistry for these songs at this time. Some of my favourite Jimi Hendrix music is off-the-cuff stuff with Band of Gypsies."

The title Sunrise Over Sea is taken from the lyrics to the second track, Peaches and Cream. The album debuted at number one in the national album charts on 15 March 2004 and achieved gold record status in its first week of release.

The Zebra EP was released in December 2003 and made the ARIA singles charts in early 2004. The song was voted No. 7 in the Triple J Hottest 100, 2004 and also was the first John Butler Trio single to gain significant airplay on commercial FM radio across Australia, although it was still quite popular on Triple J.
John Butler would win an Australasian Performing Right Association award for Song of the Year in March 2004. On 20 October 2006, the track also appeared as the opening music for the episode 'Traffic' (Season 3, Episode 5) of the popular US Crime drama Numb3rs.

In 2005 John Butler and co-founder Danielle Caruana (his wife) inaugurated the JB Seed grant program. "The Seed aims to help Australian artists from any background, creating art and music across any genre, to establish themselves as self-sustained, professional artists." Caruana also plays independent music, she plays under the name Mama Kin.

Following the Boxing Day Tsunami, the John Butler Trio appeared at the Wave Aid fundraising concert in Sydney, to raise funds for aid organisations working in disaster affected areas.

The John Butler Trio played at all venues for the Big Day Out music festival, starting in Auckland, New Zealand on 19 January 2007, and finishing in Perth Western Australia on 4 February.

Grand National 
Their fourth studio album, entitled Grand National, was released on 24 March 2007 in Australia and New Zealand, and released on 27 March 2007 in the United States and France. The first single off the album, titled "Funky Tonight", reached a high of No. 15 on the ARIA charts and No. 12 on Triple J Hottest 100 for 2006. A second single, "Better Than," was also released. In conjunction with the American release, the trio scheduled a small American Tour consisting of five cities starting in Los Angeles and ending in New York.

In April 2007 Grand National was the initial album nominated for a J Award by national youth broadcaster Triple J. "Better Than" which was released as the first overseas single from Grand National, reached No. 1 on the Triple A format charts in United States in June 2007. It also reached the top ten international songs at Japanese Radio and has been a major radio hit in France where the video made MTV's video of the week.

On 7 July 2007 they performed at the Australian leg of Live Earth in Sydney. On 31 July 2007 the John Butler Trio performed their song, "Better Than" on The Tonight Show with Jay Leno. On 4 August 2007 they performed at Newport Folk Festival playing a set that included "Used to Get High", "Better Than", "Ocean", "Funky Tonight", and "Good Excuse".

In 2007, the John Butler Trio won the Australian Independent Record (AIR) Award for Best Performing Independent Album as well as Best Independent Release and Best Blues and Roots Album at the ARIA Awards.

On 3 August 2008 they performed at Lollapalooza in Chicago.  The John Butler Trio concluded the summer of 2008 touring the U.S. with G. Love and Special Sauce.

In July 2009 "Betterman" was voted number 47 by the Australian public in Triple J Hottest 100 of all time.

On 26 March 2009 John Butler announced that the current bass and drum musicians of the John Butler Trio, Shannon Birchall and Michael Barker are separating from the band. For purely artistic reasons, John feels that it is necessary to change the line up in an attempt by John to discover new inspirations with new members. John stated in his announcement; 

Michael Barker went on to form Swamp Thing with guitarist/singer Grant Haua, based in New Zealand. Their first album Balladeer was released in May 2011.

April Uprising 
On 30 June 2009 John Butler announced the new bass and drum musicians of the John Butler Trio to be Byron Luiters as the bassist and Nicky Bomba as the drummer and percussionist. Bomba, Butler's brother-in-law, had previously been a member of the John Butler Trio.

The new line-up has spent the last few months in a studio in Fremantle, recording the band's fifth studio album, which was released 26 March 2010. The album will be called April Uprising, named after Butler's voyage to find his ancestors on SBS Television's genealogy series, Who Do You Think You Are?. The recording process for the new album has been shared with fans via a special studio sessions page on the band's website. The first single from the album, "One Way Road", was released on 4 December 2009. Butler described the song as being 

The band, according to billboard.com, recorded twenty two songs at Butler's home based studio in Fremantle, this was eventually cut down to the fifteen that appear on the album. The album was released in Australia, Germany, Belgium, Switzerland and The Netherlands on 26 March 2010, in New Zealand and France on 29 March, in the UK on 5 April, and in the USA / Canada on 6 April.

April Uprising debuted at No. 1 on the Australian ARIA albums chart on 5 April and whilst the first two singles from the album, "One Way Road" and "Close to You", charted at No. 15 and No. 36 on the Australian ARIA singles charts they both reached the top five in the Spins radio airplay charts, the former reaching No. 1.

On 4 June 2010 John Butler Trio played a show at Red Rocks Amphitheatre, which was streamed live to fans around the world at Livestream.

In 2010, the John Butler Trio received the award for Most Popular Independent Artist at the Australian Independent Record (AIR) Awards while April Uprising was nominated at the ARIA Awards for 'Best Blues and Roots Album' and 'Best Independent Release'.

In February 2012, John Butler recorded a studio version of the Trio's instrumental single "Ocean", at The Compound in Fremantle, and uploaded it to the band's YouTube channel later in that year. The 12-minute video clip went viral, and has accumulated over 35 million views online.

On 31 August 2013, it was announced by John Butler that Nicky Bomba (drums and percussion) will be leaving the band. Subsequently, on 8 October, Butler announced that Grant Gerathy of Ray Mann Three will be the new drummer for the Trio.

Flesh & Blood
Flesh & Blood, produced by Jan Skubiszewski, was released on 7 February 2014, with the initial single "Only One" released on 15 November 2013. While the single ranked 87th in the Triple J Hottest 100, 2013, the album itself received the 2014 ARIA Award for Best Blues and Roots Album, debuted at No. 2 on the Australian charts, and reached No. 7 in the Hungarian charts. The trio also undertook a large national tour in February and March 2014 to support the release of the new album.

Singles from Flesh & Blood were performed by the Trio on the American late-night talk show Conan on 24 February 2014, and for Triple J's Like a Version on 11 April 2014. Their roots rock cover of Pharrell Williams' "Happy" features on the CD and DVD releases of Like a Versions Volume Ten.

Home
John Butler Trio released the first single and title track "Home" in August 2018 ahead of the album, Home, which was released on 28 September.

On March 11, 2019, John Butler Trio announced that Byron Luiters and Grant Gerathy would be leaving the band.

Political activism
The band performed at The Wilderness Society's Save the Kimberley concert on 5 October 2012, alongside Clare Bowditch and Missy Higgins. The concert was part of a long-running campaign to protest against a proposal to industrialise the James Price Point area in Broome, Western Australia, and also featured an address from former leader of the Australian Greens, Dr Bob Brown.

MembersCurrent membersJohn Butler – lead vocals, guitars (1998–present)
Owen "OJ" Newcomb – bass, keyboards, backing vocals (2019–present)
Terepai Richmond – drums, percussion, backing vocals (2019–present)Current touring members 
Elana Stone – keyboards, percussion, backing vocals (2019–present)Former membersGavin Shoesmith – bass (1998–2001)
Jason McGann – drums, percussion (1998–2003)
Rory Quirk – bass (2001–2002)
Andrew Fry – bass (2002–2003)
Shannon Birchall – bass, backing vocals (2003–2009)
Nicky Bomba – drums, percussion (2003–2004, 2009–2013)
Michael Barker – drums, percussion, backing vocals (2003–2009)
Byron Luiters – bass, backing vocals (2009–2019)
Grant Gerathy – drums (2013–2019)Former touring membersLozz Benson – percussion, vocals (2018–2019)
Ben Corbett – keyboards, percussion, backing vocals (2018–2019)Timeline Discography Studio albums John Butler (1998)
 Three (2001)
 Sunrise Over Sea (2004)
 Grand National (2007)
 April Uprising (2010)
 Flesh & Blood (2014)
 Home (2018)Live albums'''
 Living 2001–2002 (2003)
 Live at St. Gallen (2005)
 One Small Step (2009)
 Live at Red Rocks (2011)
Tin Shed Tales (2012)

Awards and nominations
AIR Awards
The Australian Independent Record Awards (commonly known informally as AIR Awards) is an annual awards night to recognise, promote and celebrate the success of Australia's Independent Music sector.

|-
| rowspan="2" | 2006
|Live at St. Gallen 
| Best Performing Independent Album
| 
|-
| themselves 
| Independent Artist of the Year
| 
|-
| rowspan="4"| 2007
| rowspan="2"|Grand National  
| Best Performing Independent Album
| 
|-
| Best Independent Blues and Roots Album
| 
|-
| themselves 
| Independent Artist of the Year
| 
|-
| "Funky Tonight"
| Best Performing Independent Single/EP
| 
|-
| 2010
|themselves  
| Most Popular Independent Artist
| 
|-
| rowspan="2" | 2014
|Flesh & Blood 
| Best Independent Blues and Roots Album
| 
|-
| themselves 
| Independent Artist of the Year
| 
|-
| 2019
| Home| Best Independent Blues and Roots Album
| 
|-

APRA Awards
The APRA Awards are presented annually from 1982 by the Australasian Performing Right Association (APRA).

|-
| 2004 || "Zebra" || Song of the Year || 
|-
|rowspan="2"| 2006 || "Somethings Gotta Give" || Most Performed Blues & Roots Work || 
|-
| "What You Want" || Most Performed Blues & Roots Work || 
|-
|rowspan="3"| 2008 || "Better Than" || Song of the Year || 
|-
| "Funky Tonight" || Blues & Roots Work of the Year || 
|-
| "Good Excuse" || Blues & Roots Work of the Year || 
|-
| 2010 
| "One Way Road" 
| Song of the Year
| 
|-
|rowspan="5"| 2011 || "Revolution" || Song of the Year || 
|-
|rowspan="2"| "Close to You" || Blues & Roots Work of the Year || 
|-
| Most Played Australian Work ||
|-
|rowspan="2"| "One Way Road" || Blues & Roots Work of the Year || 
|-
| Most Played Australian Work ||
|-
|rowspan="2"| 2014 
|rowspan="2"|  "Only One"
| Song of the Year
| 
|-
| Blues & Roots Work of the Year
| 
|-
|rowspan="2"| 2015 ||rowspan="2"| "Livin' in the City" || Blues & Roots Work of the Year ||  
|-
| Song of the Year || 
|-
| 2019
| "Home"
| Song of the Year
| 
|-
|2020 || "Just Call" || Most Performed Blues & Roots Work of the Year|| 
|-

ARIA Awards
The ARIA Music Awards are presented annually from 1987 by the Australian Recording Industry Association (ARIA). The John Butler Trio have won six awards from twenty-eight nominations.

|-
|rowspan="4"| 2001 || Three || Best Blues & Roots Album ||  
|-
|| Three || Best Independent Release || 
|-
|| Three || Breakthrough Artist – Album ||   
|-
| John Butler Trio EP || Breakthrough Artist – Single ||  
|-
|rowspan="2"| 2003 || Living 2001-2002 || Best Blues & Roots Album ||  
|-
| Living 2001–2002|| Best Independent Release ||  
|-
|rowspan="7"| 2004 || Sunrise Over Sea || Best Cover Art ||  
|-
| Sunrise Over Sea || Engineer of the Year ||  
|-
| Sunrise Over Sea || Producer of the Year ||  
|-
| Sunrise Over Sea || Best Blues & Roots Album ||  
|-
| Sunrise Over Sea || Best Independent Release ||  
|-
| "Zebra" || Single of the Year ||  
|-
| Sunrise Over Sea || Album of the Year ||  
|-
|| 2005 || "Somethings Gotta Give" (Ben Joss and Tribal) || Best Video ||  
|-
|| 2006 || Live at St. Gallen || Best Independent Release ||  
|-
|rowspan="4"|  2007 || Grand National || Best Independent Release ||  
|-
| Grand National || Best Blues & Roots Album || 
|-
| "Funky Tonight" || Single of the Year ||  
|-
| Grand National || Album of the Year ||  
|-
|| 2008 || Live at Federation Square || Best Music DVD ||  
|-
|rowspan="2"| 2010 || April Uprising || Best Independent Release ||  
|-
| April Uprising || Best Blues & Roots Album ||  
|-
|rowspan="2"| 2011 || Live at Red Rocks || Best Independent Release ||  
|-
| Live at Red Rocks || Best Blues & Roots Album ||  
|-
|rowspan="3"| 2014 || Flesh & Blood || Best Blues & Roots Album ||  
|-
| Flesh & Blood Tour || Best Australian Live Act || 
|-
| "Only One" – Ben Young || Best Video ||  
|-
|2019 || Home || Best Blues & Roots Album ||  

J Awards
The J Awards are presented annually from 2005 by the Australian national youth radio broadcasting station, Triple J.

|-
|| J Awards of 2007 || Grand National'' || Album || 
|-
| J Awards of 2018
| himself
| Double J Artist of the Year
|

National Live Music Awards
The National Live Music Awards (NLMAs) are a broad recognition of Australia's diverse live industry, celebrating the success of the Australian live scene. The awards commenced in 2016.

|-
| 2018
| John Butler Trio
| Live Blues and Roots Act of the Year
| 
|-

Western Australian Music Industry Awards
The Western Australian Music Industry Awards (commonly known as WAMis) are annual awards presented to the local contemporary music industry, put on by the Western Australian Music Industry Association Inc (WAM). John Butler /John Butler Trio has won five awards.

 (wins only)
|-
|rowspan="3"| 2002
| John Butler Trio
| Most Popular Local Original Folk Act 
| 
|-
|rowspan="2"| John Butler
| Most Popular Male Original Vocalist 
| 
|-
| Most Popular Male Original Guitarist
| 
|-
| 2003
| John Butler Trio
| Most Popular Local Original Blues & Roots Act
| 
|-
| 2014
| "Only One" by John Butler Trio
| Most Popular Video
| 
|-

References

External links 

 
 John Butler Trio collection at the Internet Archive's live music archive
 Blender Interview
 Patrol Magazine Live Review
John Butler Trio, "April Uprising" by Billboard

APRA Award winners
ARIA Award winners
Atlantic Records artists
Australian folk music groups
Australian indie pop groups
Jam bands
Western Australian musical groups